Vice Admiral James Lacon Hammet CVO (15 May 1848 – 15 February 1905) was a Royal Navy officer who became Admiral Superintendent of Malta Dockyard.

Naval career
Promoted to captain on 1 January 1886, Hammet became commanding officer of the battleship HMS Nile in November 1893, commanding officer of the battleship HMS Sans Pareil in February 1896 and Captain of the Portsmouth Fleet Reserve in January 1898. Promoted to rear admiral on 4 March 1894, he became Admiral Superintendent of Malta Dockyard in January 1902. He was promoted to vice admiral on 1 January 1905.

References

 

1848 births
1905 deaths
Royal Navy vice admirals
Commanders of the Royal Victorian Order